Kundai Leroy Jeremiah Benyu (born 12 December 1997) is a professional footballer who plays as a midfielder for ÍBV. Born in England, he represents Zimbabwe at international level.

Early life
Benyu was born to Zimbabwean parents on 12 December 1997 in Camden Town, London. He grew up in Harlow, Essex.

Club career

Ipswich Town
Benyu joined Ipswich Town at the age of nine, signing his first professional contract after turning 17.

Aldershot Town (loan)
On 7 December 2016, Benyu joined Aldershot Town on a one-month loan deal. The loan was subsequently extended several times, allowing Benyu to finish the 2016–17 season with the National League side.

Celtic
On 29 June 2017, it was announced that Benyu had signed a four-year contract with Celtic. The midfielder scored on his first appearance for the club's development squad, in a pre-season friendly against East Kilbride. Benyu made his competitive debut in Celtic's 4–0 victory over Linfield at Celtic Park.

Oldham Athletic (loan)
On 6 January 2018, Benyu joined Oldham Athletic on loan until the end of the 2017–18 season. He made his league debut for the club on 13 January 2018 in a 1–1 home draw with Rotherham United. He was subbed off in the 74th minute, and replaced by Aaron Amadi-Holloway.

Helsingborgs (loan)
Benyu joined Swedish club Helsingborg on a season-long loan in February 2019.

Wealdstone
Benyu signed for Wealdstone on 2 October 2020. On 19 February 2021, Benyu departed by mutual consent after making twelve league appearances for the club.

Iceland
In February 2021, he has moved to Icelandic 1. deild side Vestri. In May 2022, he moved up a division to join Besta-deild karla side ÍBV.

International career
Benyu's impressive performances for Aldershot Town earned him international recognition, receiving a call-up from Zimbabwe for their 2019 Africa Cup of Nations qualifier against Liberia.

He made his full international Zimbabwe debut in a 1–0 defeat to Lesotho in Maseru on 8 November 2017.

Career statistics

References

External links
 

1997 births
Living people
Footballers from Camden Town
English people of Zimbabwean descent
People with acquired Zimbabwean citizenship
Association football midfielders
English footballers
Zimbabwean footballers
Zimbabwe international footballers
2021 Africa Cup of Nations players
Ipswich Town F.C. players
Aldershot Town F.C. players
Celtic F.C. players
Oldham Athletic A.F.C. players
Helsingborgs IF players
Wealdstone F.C. players
Vestri (football club) players
Íþróttabandalag Vestmannaeyja players
Scottish Professional Football League players
National League (English football) players
Allsvenskan players
1. deild karla players
Úrvalsdeild karla (football) players
Expatriate footballers in Sweden
English expatriate sportspeople in Sweden
Expatriate footballers in Iceland
English expatriate sportspeople in Iceland